The Men's Javelin Throw event at the 1976 Summer Olympics in Montreal, Quebec, Canada, had an entry list of 23 competitors, with two qualifying groups (23 throwers) before the final (15) took place on Saturday Monday 26, 1976. The top twelve and ties, and all those reaching 79.00 metres advanced to the final. The qualification round was held on Sunday 25, 1976.

Medalists

Abbreviations
All results shown are in metres

Records

Qualification

Group A

Group B

Final

References

External links
  Results

T
Javelin throw at the Olympics
Men's events at the 1976 Summer Olympics